NCAA Division I conference realignment refers to changes in the alignment of college or university athletic programs from one National Collegiate Athletic Association athletic conference to another.

2009–2010

2008–2009

2007–2008

2006–2007

2005–2006

2004–2005

2003–2004

2002–2003

2001–2002

2000–2001

1999–2000

1998–1999

1997–1998

1996–1997

1995–1996

1994–1995

1993–1994

1992–1993

1991–1992

1990–1991

1989–1990

1988–1989

1987–1988

1986–1987

1985–1986

1983–1984

1982–1983

1981–1982

1980–1981

1979–1980

1978–1979

1976–1977

1975–1976

1974–1975

1972–1973

1971–1972

1969–1970

1968–1969

1967–1968

1966–1967

1964–1965

1963–1964

1962–1963

1959–1960

1953–1954

1948–1949

1945–1946

1938–1939

1932–1933

1928–1929

See also 
 1996 NCAA conference realignment
 2005 NCAA conference realignment
 2010–2014 NCAA conference realignment

References 

 Realignment
College football controversies